Year 978 (CMLXXVIII) was a common year starting on Tuesday (link will display the full calendar) of the Julian calendar.

Events 
 By place 

 Byzantine Empire 
 Battle of Pankaleia: Rebel forces under General Bardas Skleros are defeated by the Byzantine army loyal to Emperor Basil II, commanded by General Bardas Phokas (the Younger), near Pankaleia (modern-day Hisarköy). Phokas regroups his forces and continues his march to the East, drawing Skleros away from Constantinople.

 Europe 
 War of the Three Henries: Emperor Otto II (the Red) supported by his nephew Otto I, duke of Bavaria and Carinthia, attacks Passau, where the rebels have assembled. In September, the town surrenders due to Otto's siege tactics, which includes a bridge of boats. Ending of the revolt of Henry II (the Wrangler) against Otto II.
 Otto II has the three insurrectionists punished at Magdeburg. Henry II is stripped of all his possessions and imprisoned in the custody of Bishop Folcmar of Utrecht. The other two: Henry III (the Younger) loses his duchy to Otto I and Henry I, bishop of Augsburg, is arrested and imprisoned in Werden Abbey (Germany).
 Franco-German war of 978–980 begins.
 Almanzor, a court official and regent of Córdoba, becomes a chamberlain (hajib) and seizes power from the 13-year-old Caliph Hisham II. During his reign, Almanzor will exercise strong influence over Subh (the mother of Hisham) and wages successful campaigns against the Christian kingdoms in Northern Spain. 
 Fall – Mieszko I, duke and prince (de facto ruler) of Poland, abducts Oda of Haldensleben from the monastery of Kalbe (Saxony-Anhalt) and marries her. She becomes Mieszko's second wife and Duchess of the Polans.
 Pandulf I (Ironhead), a Lombard prince, annexes the Principality of Salerno into his domains. For the first time, the Lombard duchies of Benevento, Capua, Salerno and Spoleto-Camerino are united under one ruler.
 Pietro I Orseolo, doge of Venice, escapes from Venice and travels to the Benedictine abbey of Michel-de-Cuxa (Southern France). He is succeeded by Vitale Candiano (not the bishop of Grado) as doge of Venice.
 Winter – Vladimir I (the Great), grand prince of Kiev, returns from Norway with a Varangian mercenary army and re-captures Novgorod. On his way to Kiev, he marches against the forces of his brother Yaropolk I.

 England 
 March 18 – King Edward II (the Martyr) is murdered at Corfe Castle (Dorsetshire) upon the orders of his step-mother Ælfthryth (or Elfrida). He is succeeded by his half-brother Æthelred II (the Unready) who becomes king of England. During his reign Æthelred tries to keep his realm from being overrun by Danish Viking invaders. 
 English troops are deployed on the Llŷn Peninsula on behalf of King Hywel of Gwynedd in order to prevent his uncle, King Iago, invading with Viking allies from Dublin. 
 The town of Guildford (Surrey) becomes the location of the Royal Mint.

 China 
 June 9 – King Qian Chu surrenders his territories and pledges allegiance to the Song Dynasty, saving his people from war and economic destruction. Qian Chu remains ruler and moves 3,000 members of his household to Bianjing (modern-day Kaifeng). Wuyue is absorbed into the Song Dynasty, effectively ending the kingdom.

 By topic 
 Literature 
 One of the Four Great Books of Song, the Taiping Guangji, a Chinese collection of deities, fairies, ghost stories and theology, is completed. The  collection is divided into 500 volumes and consists of about 3 million Chinese characters.

 Religion 
 The Badia Fiorentina, a Benedictine abbey in Florence, is founded by Willa of Tuscany, the widow of Hubert of Tuscany.

Births 
 Berno of Reichenau, German abbot (approximate date)
 Elvira of Castile, queen consort of León (approximate date)
 Ibn 'Abd al-Barr, Moorish judge and scholar (d. 1071)
 Murasaki Shikibu, Japanese poet and lady-in-waiting (or 973)
 Wang Zeng, Chinese grand chancellor (approximate date)
 Yaroslav I (the Wise), Russian grand prince (d. 1054)
 Zoë, Byzantine empress consort (approximate date)

Deaths 
 February 9 – Luitgarde, duchess consort of Normandy
 February 22 – Lambert, count of Chalon  (b. 930)
 March 18 – Edward the Martyr, king of the English
 May 18 – Frederick I, duke of Upper Lorraine
 August 15 – Li Yu, ruler ('king') of Southern Tang 
 December 3 – Abraham, Coptic pope of Alexandria
 unknown date
Aboazar Lovesendes, Portuguese nobleman 
Comhaltan Ua Clerigh, king of Hy Fiachrach (Ireland)
Fernando Ansúrez II, count of Monzón and Campos
Fernando Bermúdez, count of Cea (approximate date)
Ibn Hawqal, Muslim writer, geographer and chronicler (earliest likely date)
Geirmund the Noisy, Viking adventurer (approximate date)
Gyeongsun, king of Silla (Korea) (b. 896)
Ibn Hawqal, Muslim Arab geographer
Lashkari ibn Muhammad, Shaddadid emir
Máel Muad mac Brain, king of Munster (Ireland)
Rogvolod, prince of Polotsk (approximate date)
Yang Guangmei, Chinese general (approximate date)

References